Hamza Andreas Tzortzis (born 1980) is a British writer, philosopher, public speaker, researcher on Islam, and Muslim apologist. He is a British Muslim convert of Greek descent. He has authored The Divine Reality: God, Islam and The Mirage of Atheism, in this book, he provides a compelling case for the rational and spiritual foundations of Islam, whilst intelligently and compassionately deconstructing atheism.

Career
Tzortzis has been invited as a guest speaker at several universities and Muslim conferences. He has spoken in the United Kingdom and Australia. Tzortzis was involved in publishing a survey study in 2010 to gauge non-Muslims' views of Islam in the United Kingdom. In 2015 he was a finalist for Religious Advocate of the Year at the British Muslim Awards. Tzortzis has contributed to the BBC news programs: The Big Questions and Newsnight. Tzortzis stepped down from his role at iERA and joined the Sapience Institute as of 2020.

Andrew Gilligan described Tzortzis in a 2010 The Telegraph article as "a former researcher for the hardline Hittin Institute and chaired the launch event of iERA, an umbrella organisation hosting many well-known British Muslim extremists who preach opposition to democracy and hatred against homosexuals and Jews." Tzortzis calls this misrepresentations and lies. Noting that Keele University had cancelled a speech by Tzortzis, the Stoke Sentinel called him a "radical Islamic speaker ... a former member of the radical group Hizb ut-Tahrir which believes in the idea of an Islamic state ... who supports Sharia law ... [and has] also been linked to controversial comments on homosexuality and a series of other issues." Tzortzis said in a 2016 interview that, whilst he still sees homosexuality as "sinful" in the eyes of God, he condemns any violence towards the homosexual community. According to Metro, Tzortzis has "claimed that those who leave the Islamic faith ‘should be killed.'" He has since stated that he does not believe apostasy laws, which he calls "outdated". Tzortzis also criticises child marriage, opposes extremism, denounces the Islamic State of Iraq and the Levant (ISIS), and tries to present a peaceful case for Islam. In 2016 India's National Investigation Agency (NIA), in a chargesheet against the Islamic State, named Tzortzis as having directly or indirectly influenced suspects accused of having links with ISIS. Tzortzis says that he has influenced Muslims of all persuasions and cannot be blamed for extremists latching onto his words. He further stated that ISIS are "spiritually diseased, sick people".

Publications

Books 
The Divine Reality: God, Islam and the Mirage of Atheism. FB Publishing, 2016.

Translations

Bengali 

 The Divine Reality: Allah, Islam o Nastikkobader Morichika. Tr. Masud Shorif, Sean Publications, 2020.
 Liberalism o Muslim Somaj (Liberalism and Muslim Society). Tr. Hossain Shakil, Minarah Publications, Unpublished.

Arabic 

 al-Haqiqah al-Ilahiyyah: Allah wal-Islam wa Sarab al-Ilhad (The Divine Reality). Tr. Naif al-Mal, Markaz Dalil, 2016.

Papers and Articles 

 Embryology in the Qur’an | iERA Research
 An Introduction to the Literary & Linguistic Excellence of the Qur’an | Islam21C
 Why do Muslims love the Prophet Muhammad ﷺ? | Islam21C
 Is Islamic Society Barbaric? | Islam21C
 A Note on Understanding Islam:Liberalism’s Origins & the Superimposition of a Specific European Experience | Islam21C

References

External links

1980 births
Living people
British Sunni Muslims
Converts to Islam from atheism or agnosticism
British Islamists
21st-century Muslims
British people of Greek descent
Former members of Hizb ut-Tahrir
Former atheist critics of atheism